On the Way to the Sky is the fourteenth studio album released by Neil Diamond in 1981. It contained the hit "Yesterday's Songs", which reached number eleven on the Billboard Hot 100 (and number one on the Hot Adult Contemporary Tracks chart), title track which peaked at number 27 in the US and a third single, "Be Mine Tonight", which also reached the Top 40, peaking at number 35.

Cash Box said of "Be Mine Tonight" that "from the full production to the singer's unique charisma and delivery, everything works here."  Billboard said that it's a "bristling midtempo rocker with much of the energy and sass of 'America' or 'Longfellow Serenade.'"

For shipments of a million copies, the album was certified Platinum by the RIAA, but underperformed the previous year's 5× Platinum Jazz Singer, which reached number three on the albums chart and spawned three Billboard Top 10 hits.

Track listing

Personnel 
 Neil Diamond – lead vocals, arrangements (5)
 Alan Lindgren – keyboards, synthesizers, acoustic piano, orchestra arrangements and conductor (1, 2, 3, 5, 7, 10)
 Tom Hensley – keyboards, acoustic piano, backing vocals, orchestra arrangements and conductor (4, 6, 8, 10)
 Richard Bennett – acoustic guitar, electric guitar
 Doug Rhone – guitar, backing vocals
 Reinie Press – bass
 Dennis St. John – drums
 King Errisson – percussion
 Vince Charles – percussion
 Patricia Henderson – backing vocals
 Linda Press – backing vocals
 H.L. Voelker – backing vocals
 Julia Waters – backing vocals
 Luther Waters – backing vocals
 Maxine Waters – backing vocals
 Oren Waters – backing vocals

Production 
 Producer – Neil Diamond
 Co-Producer – Dennis St. John 
 Associate Producers – Andy Bloch, Ron Hitchcock and Alan Lindgren.
 Engineered and Mixed by Andy Bloch and Ron Hitchcock
 Assistant Engineers – Bill Benton, David Bianco, Jack Crymes, Mark Eshelman, Brad Gilderman, John Markland, Karen Segal and Gary Singleman.
 Recorded at Arch Angel Studios, Record Plant and The Village Recorder (Los Angeles, CA); Sunset Sound Recorders and Cherokee Studios (Hollywood, CA).
 Mastered by Mike Reese at The Mastering Lab (Los Angeles, CA).
 Art Direction and Design – David Kirschner
 Artwork – Jan Weinberg
 Photography – Kenneth McGowan

Certifications

References

Neil Diamond albums
1981 albums
Columbia Records albums
Albums recorded at Sunset Sound Recorders